Con Calma Tour was a concert tour by Puerto Rican rapper Daddy Yankee. The tour name references his 2019 single "Con Calma".

Commercial response 
In the first leg in Chile, concerts were reported sold out and the remaining concerts received good attendance. In the European leg, Madrid, Amsterdam, Tel Avi, London and Paris concerts were reported sold out. Yankee become the first reggaeton artist ever to have sold out the O2 arena and the AccorHotels Arena.

In December 2019, he announced his concerts in his native Puerto Rico with the name Con Calma Pal Choli. This was his first tour as a headliner in the Coliseo de Puerto Rico since the 2007 Big Boss World Tour. Owing the high demand, it ends with a record-breaking twelve sold-out shows and more than 170,000 tickets sold. and with US$6 million gross, and $14 million in ticket sales. All the shows were sold out in just hours. Because of this, Daddy Yankee broke the record for the most consecutive shows in the arena, previously hold by Wisin & Yandel with nine.

Critical reception 
Caroline Sullivan from the guardian gave a positive review with 4 out of 5 stars and stated "a jubilantly Latino Saturday night blowout". Also, she mentioned in the article "The reggaeton maestro flirted his way through a triumphant set in which language was no barrier to enjoying the party"

Tour dates

Attendance

Box Office Data

References 

2019 concert tours
Concert tours of Europe
Daddy Yankee concert tours